Le Vésinet is a suburban commune in the Yvelines department in the Île-de-France region in north-central France. It is a part of the affluent outer suburbs of western Paris,  from the centre of Paris. In 2019, it had a population of 15,943.

Le Vésinet is one of the wealthiest suburbs of Paris, known for its wooded avenues, mansions and lakes. It contains many public gardens designed by French landscape gardener Paul de Lavenne, comte de Choulot.

History
The commune of Le Vésinet was created on 31 May 1875 by detaching a part of the territory of Chatou and merging it with a part of the territory of Croissy-sur-Seine and a part of the territory of Le Pecq.

Geography

Le Vésinet is located in a bend of the Seine, but has no access to the river. It is 16.4 km (10.2 mi) west of Paris and 4 km east of Saint-Germain-en-Laye. The surrounding communes are Chatou on the east, Croissy-sur-Seine on the south, Le Pecq on the west, and Montesson on the north.

The terrain is an alluvial plain ranging in altitude from 28 meters near Le Pecq to 45 meters at the end of the Route de Montesson, with a gentle slope from northeast to southwest.

The commune is entirely urbanized, principally with single-family dwellings. Green space comprises 20 percent of the territory. There are a number of lakes: the lac Supérieur, the lac Inférieur, the lac de la Station, the lac de Croissy, and the Grand lac (with a large central island, l'Île des Ibis) also called Lac des Ibis. These lakes are linked by nearly 4 km of artificial streams called les Petites Rivières.

Population

Sights
Le Vésinet was the first "ville-parc" to be built in France. It has many green spaces, lakes, and lavish mansions.

The following are notable buildings:
L'hôpital du Vésinet (72 avenue de la Princesse), built by Eugène Laval in 1859 
Sainte-Marguerite (place de l'Eglise), built by Louis-Auguste Boileau from 1862 to 1865, the first non-industrial building in France built of concrete
Villa Berthe ou La Hublotière (72 route de Montesson), built by Hector Guimard in 1896.
Pink Palace (12 rue Diderot), built on the model of the Grand Trianon in Versailles by Arthur Schweitzer about 1900
Wood Cottage (122 boulevard des Etats-Unis), classified as a historic monument in 2000. Built in 1864 by Tricotel, a landscaping firm.
Villa Olivia (12 avenue Rembrandt) built by Pierre-Joseph Olive
Sainte-Pauline, built in 1905

Since 1997, Le Vésinet has received the ultimate distinction of four flowers in the national competition for villes fleuries.

Transport
Le Vésinet is served by two stations on Paris RER line A: Le Vésinet – Centre and Le Vésinet – Le Pecq.

Education
The following public schools are in Le Vésinet:

Preschools: 
Ecole maternelle Centre
Ecole maternelle Charmettes 
Ecole maternelle La Borde
Ecole maternelle Princesse
Ecole maternelle Les Cygnes

Elementary schools:
Ecole élémentaire Merlettes
Ecole élémentaire Pallu
Ecole élémentaire Pasteur 
Ecole élémentaire Princesse

Secondary schools:
Collège du Cèdre (junior high school)
Lycée Alain (senior high school/sixth form college)

Private schools:
 Bon-Sauveur (preschool through senior high school)
 Sainte-Jeanne-d’Arc (preschool and elementary school)
 Sainte-Odile (preschool and elementary school)
 Ecole Saint-Charles (elementary school)

International school:
 Malherbe International School (nursery through middle school)  

Le Vésinet is served by the Bibliothèque intercommunale du Vésinet, a library.

Twin towns – sister cities

Le Vésinet is twinned with:
 Oakwood, United States
 Outremont (Montreal), Canada
 Unterhaching, Germany
 Villanueva de la Cañada, Spain
 Worcester, England, United Kingdom

Le Vésinet also has friendly relations with Hunters Hill in Australia.

See also
Communes of the Yvelines department

References

External links

Official website 

Communes of Yvelines